In logic, philosophy, and theoretical computer science, dynamic logic is an extension of modal logic capable of encoding properties of computer programs.

A simple example of a statement in dynamic logic is

which states that if the ground is currently dry and it rains, then afterwards the ground will be wet.

The syntax of dynamic logic contains a language of propositions (like "the ground is dry") and a language of actions (like "it rains").
The action language supports operations  (doing one action followed by another),  (doing one action or another), and iteration  (doing one action zero or more times). The proposition language supports Boolean operations (and, or, and not). The action logic is expressive enough to encode programs. For an arbitrary program , precondition , and postcondition , the dynamic logic statement  encodes the correctness of the program, making dynamic logic more general than Hoare logic.

Beyond its use in formal verification of programs, dynamic logic has been applied to describe complex behaviors arising in linguistics, philosophy, AI, and other fields.

Language

Dynamic logic permits compound actions built up from smaller actions. While the basic control operators of any programming language could be used for this purpose, Kleene's regular expression operators are a good match to modal logic. The compound action , sequence, is performed by performing first  and then . The compound action , iteration, is performed by performing  zero or more times, sequentially.

Axioms

These operators can be axiomatized in dynamic logic as follows, taking as already given a suitable axiomatization of modal logic including such axioms for modal operators as the above-mentioned axiom  and the two inference rules modus ponens ( and  implies ) and necessitation ( implies ).

A1.  

A2.  

A3.  

A4.  

A5.  

A6.  

Axiom A1 makes the empty promise that when BLOCK terminates,  will hold, even if  is the proposition false.  (Thus BLOCK abstracts the essence of the action of hell freezing over.)
A2 says that NOP acts as the identity function on propositions, that is, it transforms  into itself.
A5 is the evident result of applying A2, A3 and A4 to the equation  of Kleene algebra.
A6 is recognizable as mathematical induction with the action n := n+1 of incrementing n generalized to arbitrary actions .

Derivations

The modal logic axiom  permits the derivation of the following six theorems corresponding to the above:

T1.  

T2.  

T3.  

T4.  

T5.  

T6.  

T1 asserts the impossibility of bringing anything about by performing BLOCK.
T2 notes again that NOP changes nothing, bearing in mind that NOP is both deterministic and terminating whence  and  have the same force.
T4 is just like A4.
T5 is explained as for A5.

Box and diamond are entirely symmetric with regard to which one takes as primitive. An alternative axiomatization would have been to take the theorems T1–T6 as axioms, from which we could then have derived A1–A6 as theorems.

However the dynamic nature of dynamic logic moves this distinction out of the realm of abstract axiomatics into the common-sense experience of situations in flux. The inference rule , for example, is sound because its premise asserts that  holds at all times, whence no matter where  might take us,  will be true there. For example,  will be true in any situation where  is false, or in any situation where  is true, but the assertion  is false in any situation where  has value 1, and therefore is not valid.

Derived rules of inference

As for modal logic, the inference rules modus ponens and necessitation suffice also for dynamic logic as the only primitive rules it needs, as noted above. However, as usual in logic, many more rules can be derived from these with the help of the axioms. An example instance of such a derived rule in dynamic logic is that if kicking a broken TV once can't possibly fix it, then repeatedly kicking it can't possibly fix it either. Hence the premise  means that if the TV is broken, then after kicking it once it will still be broken.  denotes the action of kicking the TV zero or more times. Hence the conclusion  means that if the TV is broken, then after kicking it zero or more times it will still be broken. For if not, then after the second-to-last kick the TV would be in a state where kicking it once more would fix it, which the premise claims can never happen under any circumstances.

The inference  is sound. However the implication  is not valid because we can easily find situations in which  holds but  does not. In any such counterexample situation,  must hold but  must be false, while  however must be true. But this could happen in any situation where the TV is broken but can be revived with two kicks. The implication fails (is not valid) because it only requires that  hold now, whereas the inference succeeds (is sound) because it requires that  hold in all situations, not just the present one.

An example of a valid implication is the proposition . This says that if  is greater or equal to 3, then after incrementing ,  must be greater or equal to 4. Hence the above proposition is equivalent to  asserting that if  is greater or equal to 3 then after performing ,  might be greater or equal to 4.

Assignment

The Hoare axiom for assignment is not given as a single axiom but rather as an axiom schema.

A7.  

This is a schema in the sense that  can be instantiated with any formula  containing zero or more instances of a variable . Such an axiom schema allows infinitely many axioms having a common form to be written as a finite expression connoting that form.

This asserts that it is possible, by incrementing  sufficiently often, to make  equal to 7. This of course is not always true, e.g. if  is 8 to begin with, or 6.5, whence this proposition is not a theorem of dynamic logic. If  is of type integer however, then this proposition is true if and only if  is at most 7 to begin with, that is, it is just a roundabout way of saying .

Likewise, the action  is still the same action after incrementing , even though incrementing  will result in its executing in a different environment. However,  itself is not a rigid designator with respect to the modality ; if it denotes 3 before incrementing , it denotes 4 after. So we can't just substitute  for  everywhere in A6.

One way of dealing with the opacity of modalities is to eliminate them. Now apply A4 to turn  into , having  modalities. The remaining modality can now be eliminated with one more use of Hoare's axiom to give .

The importance of keeping this typing information straight becomes apparent if  had been of type integer, or even real, for any of which A6 is perfectly valid as an axiom. If in a given state  is a natural number, then the antecedent of the main implication of A6 holds, but then  is also a natural number so the consequent also holds. If  is not a natural number, then the antecedent is false and so A6 remains true regardless of the truth of the consequent. We could strengthen A6 to an equivalence  without impacting any of this, the other direction being provable from A5, from which we see that if the antecedent of A6 does happen to be false somewhere, then the consequent must be false.

Test

Dynamic logic associates to every proposition  an action  called a test. When  holds, the test  acts as a NOP, changing nothing while allowing the action to move on.  When  is false,  acts as BLOCK. Tests can be axiomatized as follows.

A8.  

T8.  

Hence when  is true the performer of the action can only take the left branch, and when  is false the right.

This performs  zero or more times and then performs .

Quantification as random assignment

The random-assignment statement  denotes the nondeterministic action of setting  to an arbitrary value.  then says that  holds no matter what you set  to, while  says that it is possible to set  to a value that makes  true.  thus has the same meaning as the universal quantifier , while  similarly corresponds to the existential quantifier . That is, first-order logic can be understood as the dynamic logic of programs of the form .

Dijkstra claimed to show the impossibility of a program that sets the value of variable  to an arbitrary positive integer. However, in dynamic logic with assignment and the * operator,  can be set to an arbitrary positive integer with the dynamic logic program . Hence we must either reject Dijkstra's argument or hold that the * operator is not effective.

Possible-world semantics

Modal logic is most commonly interpreted in terms of possible world semantics or Kripke structures.  This semantics carries over naturally to dynamic logic by interpreting worlds as states of a computer in the application to program verification, or states of our environment in applications to linguistics, AI, etc.  One role for possible world semantics is to formalize the intuitive notions of truth and validity, which in turn permit the notions of soundness and completeness to be defined for axiom systems.  An inference rule is sound when validity of its premises implies validity of its conclusion.  An axiom system is sound when all its axioms are valid and its inference rules are sound.  An axiom system is complete when every valid formula is derivable as a theorem of that system.  These concepts apply to all systems of logic including dynamic logic.

Propositional dynamic logic (PDL)

Ordinary or first-order logic has two types of terms, respectively assertions and data. As can be seen from the examples above, dynamic logic adds a third type of term denoting actions. Propositional logic is derived from first-order logic by omitting data terms and reasons only about abstract propositions, which may be simple propositional variables or atoms or compound propositions built with such logical connectives as and, or, and not.

Propositional dynamic logic, or PDL, was derived from dynamic logic in 1977 by Michael J. Fischer and Richard Ladner. PDL blends the ideas behind propositional logic and dynamic logic by adding actions while omitting data; hence the terms of PDL are actions and propositions. The TV example above is expressed in PDL whereas the next example involving  is in first-order dynamic logic. PDL is to (first-order) dynamic logic as propositional logic is to first-order logic.

Fischer and Ladner showed in their 1977 paper that PDL satisfiability was of computational complexity at most nondeterministic exponential time, and at least deterministic exponential time in the worst case. This gap was closed in 1978 by Vaughan Pratt who showed that PDL was decidable in deterministic exponential time. In 1977, Krister Segerberg proposed a complete axiomatization of PDL, namely any complete axiomatization of modal logic K together with axioms A1–A6 as given above. Completeness proofs for Segerberg's axioms were found by Gabbay (unpublished note), Parikh (1978), Pratt (1979), and Kozen and Parikh (1981).

History

The approach was later published in 1976 as a logical system in its own right. The system parallels 
Andrzej Salwicki's system of algorithmic logic  and Edsger Dijkstra's notion of weakest-precondition predicate transformer , with  corresponding to Dijkstra's , weakest liberal precondition. Those logics however made no connection with either modal logic, Kripke semantics, regular expressions, or the calculus of binary relations. Dynamic logic therefore can be viewed as a refinement of algorithmic logic and predicate transformers that connects them up to the axiomatics and Kripke semantics of modal logic as well as to the calculi of binary relations and regular expressions.

The concurrency challenge

Hoare logic, algorithmic logic, weakest preconditions, and dynamic logic are all well suited to discourse and reasoning about sequential behavior.  Extending these logics to concurrent behavior however has proved problematic.  There are various approaches but all of them lack the elegance of the sequential case.  In contrast Amir Pnueli's 1977 system of temporal logic, another variant of modal logic sharing many common features with dynamic logic, differs from all of the above-mentioned logics by being what Pnueli has characterized as an "endogenous" logic, the others being "exogenous" logics.  By this Pnueli meant that temporal logic assertions are interpreted within a universal behavioral framework in which a single global situation changes with the passage of time, whereas the assertions of the other logics are made externally  to the multiple actions about which they speak.  The advantage of the endogenous approach is that it makes no fundamental assumptions about what causes what as the environment changes with time.  Instead a temporal logic formula can talk about two unrelated parts of a system, which because they are unrelated tacitly evolve in parallel.  In effect ordinary logical conjunction of temporal assertions is the concurrent composition operator of temporal logic.  The simplicity of this approach to concurrency has resulted in temporal logic being the modal logic of choice for reasoning about concurrent systems with its aspects of synchronization, interference, independence, deadlock, livelock, fairness, etc.

See also 

 Hoare logic
 Kleene algebra
 Temporal logic
 Temporal logic in finite-state verification
 Temporal logic of actions
 Modal μ-calculus

Further reading 

 David Harel, Dexter Kozen, and Jerzy Tiuryn, "Dynamic Logic".  MIT Press, 2000 (450 pp).

 Nicolas Troquard and Philippe Balbiani, "Propositional Dynamic Logic." Stanford encyclopedia of philosophy, 2007.

Footnotes

References
 Vaughan Pratt, "Semantical Considerations on Floyd-Hoare Logic", Proc. 17th Annual IEEE Symposium on Foundations of Computer Science, 1976, 109-121.
 David Harel, "Dynamic Logic", In D. Gabbay and F. Guenthner, editors, Handbook of Philosophical Logic, volume II: Extensions of Classical Logic, chapter 10, pages 497-604. Reidel, Dordrecht, 1984.
  David Harel, Dexter Kozen, and Jerzy Tiuryn, "Dynamic Logic", In D. Gabbay and F. Guenthner, editors, Handbook of Philosophical Logic, volume 4: pages 99-217. Kluwer, 2nd edition, 2002.

External links
 Semantical Considerations on Floyd-Hoare Logic (original paper on dynamic logic)
 Chapter 6 : Logic and Action at Logic In Action site
 Lecture Notes on Dynamic Logic by André Platzer

Modal logic
Logic in computer science
Non-classical logic